is a Japanese politician, who was a member of House of Representatives and Liberal Democratic Party.

Born in Chiyoda, Tokyo he graduated from Chuo University in 1966. He was elected for the first time in 1993 after an unsuccessful run in 1990.  He represented the 3rd District of Niigata Prefecture until 2009.

References

External links
 Official website

1943 births
Living people
People from Chiyoda, Tokyo
Politicians from Tokyo
Chuo University alumni
Members of the House of Representatives (Japan)
Liberal Democratic Party (Japan) politicians
21st-century Japanese politicians